Bandfield is a lunar impact crater that is located nearly on the border of the near side and far side of the Moon. It lies on the west rim of the crater Hirayama, near Hume and Swasey.  The crater has a bright system of rays and is thus young (Copernican age).

The crater's name was approved by the IAU on 8 July 2022.  It is named after the American planetary scientist Joshua Bandfield (1974-2019).  Bandfield worked on instruments on many spacecraft including OSIRIS-REx, 2001 Mars Odyssey, Mars Reconnaissance Orbiter, Lunar Reconnaissance Orbiter, Mars Global Surveyor, and Mars Exploration Rovers.

References

External links
 LTO-82A4 Hirayama — L&PI topographic map showing Bandfield